The Cabinet Wulff II was the state government of the German state of Lower Saxony from 26 February 2008 until 1 July 2010. The Cabinet was headed by Minister President Christian Wulff and was formed by the Christian Democratic Union and the Free Democratic Party. On 26 February 2008 Wulff was re-elected and sworn in as Minister President by the Landtag of Lower Saxony, after Wulff's winning of the 2008 Lower Saxony state election.

On 30 June 2010, Christian Wulff resigned as Minister President hours before taking office as President of Germany

Composition 

|}

References

Notes

Wulff II
2008 establishments in Germany
2010 disestablishments in Germany